Aybüke Arslan (born 1 January 1994) is a Turkish women's football midfielder currently playing in the First League for Trabzon İdmanocağı with jersey number 8. She was a member of the Turkey U-17 and Turkey U-19 teams.

Career

Club

She received her license on 20 March 2008 for her hometown club Trabzonspor, and played three seasons in the Turkish Women's First League for them. After her first season already, she enjoyed league championship. Arslan took part at the 2009–10 UEFA Women's Champions League. She capped 28 times and scored five goals.

At the end of the 2010–11 season, Trabzonspor closed down their women's football branch. Aybüke Arslan moved then to the rival club of Trabzon İdmanocağı, where she currently plays. In 2012, she suffered a knee cruciate ligament injury during a national team training that left her out of the squad for the entire 2012–13 season. After a successful surgery, she returned to the football field again the next season.

International
Aybüke Arslan was admitted to the Turkey girls' U-17 team, and debuted in the friendly match against Bulgaria on 26 June 2009. She took part at the 2010 UEFA Women's Under-17 Championship – Group 4 matches. She capped nine times and scored one goal for the Turkey U-17 team.

She was called up to the Turkey women's U-19 team, and appeared for the first time in the friendly game against Russia on 5 February 2010. Arslan played at the 2011 UEFA Women's U-19 Championship First qualifying round – Group 9 and 2012 Kuban Spring Tournament matches. She appeared in seven matches for the Turkey women's U-19 team.

Career statistics

Honours
 Turkish Women's First League
 Trabzonspor
 Winners (1): 2008–09
 Runners-up (1): 2009–10

 Trabzon İdmanocağı
 Third places (2): 2011–12, 2014–15

References

External links

Living people
1994 births
Sportspeople from Trabzon
Turkish women's footballers
Trabzonspor women's players
Trabzon İdmanocağı women's players
Women's association football midfielders